Leo Weinkauf (born 7 July 1996) is a German professional footballer who plays as a goalkeeper for  club Hannover 96.

Career
Weinkauf moved to MSV Duisburg on 18 June 2019, on loan from Hannover 96. He made his professional debut in the 3. Liga on 20 July 2019, starting in the home match against Sonnenhof Großaspach. After the 2020–21 season, he was loaned to Duisburg for another year.

Career statistics

References

External links

1996 births
Living people
Sportspeople from Oldenburg
Footballers from Lower Saxony
German footballers
Association football goalkeepers
VfL Oldenburg players
SV Werder Bremen players
FC Bayern Munich II players
Hannover 96 II players
Hannover 96 players
MSV Duisburg players
3. Liga players
Regionalliga players